The Latvian Academy of Sciences is the official science academy of Latvia and is an association of the country's foremost scientists. The academy was founded as the Latvian SSR Academy of Sciences. It is located in Riga. The current President of the academy is Ivars Kalviņš.

Building 
The Academy of Sciences edifice was built after World War II, between 1951 and 1961, collecting the necessary financing from the newly established kolkhozes in Latvia and – as further expenses increased, collecting the finances as "voluntary donations" deducted from the salaries of the Latvian rural population.

The building is decorated with several hammer and sickle symbols as well as Latvian folk ornaments and motifs. The spire was originally decorated with a wreath and a five pointed star, which was removed after Latvia regained independence in 1991.

The building, designed by Osvalds Tīlmanis, Vaidelotis Apsītis, and Kārlis Plūksne, is a cousin to similar Stalin-era skyscrapers, which were representative of what became known as Stalinist architecture (sometimes referred to as Socialist Classicism). The architecture of the skyscraper resembles many others built in the Soviet Union at the time, most notably the main building of Moscow State University. Local nicknames include Stalin's birthday cake and the Kremlin.

The view of Riga cityscape is open for public viewing from the 17th-floor balcony (height of ). The tower is located in the suburb of Maskavas Vorstadt.

Gallery

See also 
All-Russia Exhibition Centre
Eighth Sister
Hotel Leningradskaya
Ministry of Foreign Affairs of Russia
Red Gates Administrative Building
Moscow State University
Palace of the Soviets
Seven Sisters (Moscow)
Triumph Palace
Warsaw Palace of Culture and Science
House of the Free Press in Bucharest

References

External links
 International cooperation of the Latvian Academy of Sciences

Buildings and structures built in the Soviet Union
Buildings and structures in Riga
Tourist attractions in Riga
Skyscrapers in Latvia
National academies of sciences
Socialist realism
1946 establishments in Latvia
Stalinist architecture
USSR Academy of Sciences
University and college buildings completed in 1956
Members of the International Council for Science
Research institutes established in 1946
Members of the International Science Council